NcFTPd is the FTP server written by NcFTP Software Inc.  Unlike the client application from the same company, NcFTP, NcFTPd is distributed under a proprietary license.  Having been released in 1991 with continuing releases through 2012, it is one of the most venerable server software in use on the Internet.

See also 
 NcFTP

FTP server software